This is a list of newspapers in Uruguay.

Current Newspapers 

Brecha (Montevideo) Digital edition
Búsqueda (Montevideo) Digital edition
El Observador (Montevideo) Digital edition
El País (Montevideo) Digital edition
La Diaria (Montevideo) Digital edition
La República (Montevideo) Digital edition
MercoPress (Montevideo) Digital edition
Últimas Noticias (Montevideo) Digital edition
El Telégrafo (Paysandú) Digital edition

Defunct newspapers  

El Día (Montevideo)
El Diario (Montevideo)
La Mañana (Montevideo)
The Montevideo Times (Montevideo)
Germinal (Montevideo)
Acción
El Plata

See also

List of newspapers

External links
 

Uruguay
Newspapers